Thomas Liese (born 10 August 1968 in Sangerhausen) is a former German professional cyclist.

Major victories

1989
1st Olympia's Tour
1990
1st Niedersachsen-Rundfahrt
1998
1st Tour of Greece
1st Rund um die Hainleite
2000
1st Sachsen Tour
2001
1st Stage 4 Settimana Ciclista Lombarda
1st Stage 8 Peace Race
1st  National Time Trial Championships
2003
1st stage Bayern-Rundfahrt

References

1968 births
Living people
People from Sangerhausen
People from Bezirk Halle
German male cyclists
Cyclists from Saxony-Anhalt
East German male cyclists